Pulkurti (Telugu: పుల్కుర్తి)  is a village located in Telangana state, Sangareddy district.

Statistical details 
According to the 2011 Indian Census, the village has 306 houses and a population of 1,596, spread over an area of 889 hectares. The number of males in the village is 738 and the number of females is 858. The number of scheduled castes is 421 while the number of scheduled tribes is 2. The census location code of the village is 572762 .

Land usage 
The land use in Pulkurti (Manur) is as follows:

Non-agricultural land: 

Barren land: 

Net sown land: 

Land without water:

References 

Villages in Manoor, Medak